Chamberland may refer to:

 Charles Chamberland (1851–1908), French inventor of the autoclave device,
 Dennis Chamberland (b. 1951), American bioengineer, explorer, and author,